Stop43 is a UK-based digital rights group that lobbies on behalf of photographers for the preservation of their copyrights.   They ran a viral campaign in 2010 to oppose a change in British law that would have removed copyright protection from orphaned works.  The campaign was successful.

In 2011 they proposed offering an “e-Bay-style trading marketplace for images”  Unlike some alternative registration programs, images would be registered and marked at no charge to the image producer.

See also
Digital Economy Act 2010
Open Rights Group

References

External links
Stop43 home page

Copyright law organizations